Mohammad Reza Rouyanian is an Iranian businessman, football administrator and former Revolutionary Guard commander. He was the chairman of famous multisport club Persepolis Athletic and Cultural Club from 20 September 2011 until his resignation on 22 January 2014. He was Head of Transportation Management Center from 2007 to 2011. Before that, he was Commissioner of the City of Tehran Transportation Police between 2005 and 2007.

Early life
He was born on 12 May 1960 in Noor, Mazandaran Province, Iran. He was joined to the City of Noor Police in 1981 and became Commissioner ten years later. After serving two years as Commissioner of Noor Police, he was appointed as Commissioner of Mazandaran Province Police in 1993. He is married and has two daughters and one son.

Police career
He was Commissioner of Mazandaran Province Police from 1993 to 2000. He was appointed as first Head of Social Section and was in office until 2005 He became Commissioner of the City of Tehran Transportation Police in 2005. Rouyanian was retired in 2007 and was appointed as Transportation Management Center by President Mahmoud Ahmadinejad one the same year. He resigned from this position in 2011.

Sports career
He was a member of Iran military team from 1985 to 1990. He was Ahmadinejad's candidate as head of National Sports Organization in 2009 to succeeding Mohammad Aliabadi but he was refused and withdrawn from this position. He was appointed as one of the board of directors of the Persepolis club on 19 September 2011 and was elected as chairman of Persepolis and succeeded Habib Kashani, a day after on 20 September 2011.

On 23 December 2011, Rouyanian appointed Mustafa Denizli as new coach of Persepolis.

He signed contracts with Saeid Ghadami and Éamon Zayed in mid-season as the first players who signed during his time as chairman of Persepolis and also brought back the legend, Mehdi Mahdavikia and signed with Asmir Avdukić on loan.

He managed to attract major players in the transfer season, summer 2012. Shahab Gordan, Jalal Hosseini, Hossein Mahini, Mehrdad Pouladi, Mohsen Bengar, Mohammad Ghazi, Mohammad Reza Khanzadeh, Afshin Esmaeilzadeh, Roberto Sousa, Karim Ansarifard, Amir Abedzadeh, Mehrzad Madanchi and Nilson Corrêa, are an example of his purchase. Since then, the team was dubbed the Red Galaxy. After Denizli's resignation, he open talks with Manuel José, Bruno Metsu, Gérard Houllier and Gabriel Calderón and finally signs with Manuel José. In middle of that season José was fired and Yahya Golmohammadi who was the second team coach accepted the president's offer to lead Persepolis. On 20 May 2013, Ali Daei was officially announced as the club's manager for the next three seasons by Rouyanian. On 22 January 2014, Rouyanian resigned as the club's chairman and his resignation was accepted by the board of directors.

Signings

References

External links

1960 births
Iranian football chairmen and investors
Living people
Iranian sports executives and administrators
Presidential advisers of Iran
Islamic Revolutionary Guard Corps personnel of the Iran–Iraq War
Islamic Revolution Committees personnel
Iranian police officers
People from Nowshahr